Matías Claudio Cuffa (born 10 March 1981) is an Italian Argentine footballer.

Biography
Born in Alta Gracia, Córdoba Province, Cuffa started his professional career at Italian Serie D club Isernia. He then spent 2 seasons in Serie C2 clubs. In July 2005 he was signed by Serie A club Chievo along with Salvatore Giardina but farmed to Pisa in co-ownership deal along with Giardina. In January 2006, he was loaned to fellow Serie C1 club Foggia. In June 2006 Chievo bought back both player. In July 2006 he was loaned to Juve Stabia but later loaned to Catanzaro. In July 2007 he left for PortoSummaga along with Giardina.

In July 2009 he was signed by newly promoted Serie B team Padova in co-ownership deal. In exchange, PortoSummaga signed Davide Bianchi, also in co-ownership deal.

In July 2018 he joined Serie D team Mantova. On 8 August 2019 Cuffa announced his retirement from football.

References

External links
 Legaserieb.it Profile 
 Football.it Profile 
 La Gazzetta dello Sport Profile 

1981 births
Living people
Argentine footballers
Argentine expatriate footballers
Serie B players
Serie C players
Serie D players
A.S.D. Sangiovannese 1927 players
S.S.D. Città di Gela players
Pisa S.C. players
Calcio Foggia 1920 players
S.S. Juve Stabia players
U.S. Catanzaro 1929 players
A.S.D. Portogruaro players
Calcio Padova players
Matera Calcio players
A.S.D. Victor San Marino players
U.S. Viterbese 1908 players
F.C. Rieti players
Mantova 1911 players
Association football midfielders
Expatriate footballers in Italy
Argentine expatriate sportspeople in Italy
Citizens of Italy through descent
Argentine people of Italian descent
Sportspeople from Córdoba Province, Argentina